Miss Prissy is a fictional character in Warner Bros. cartoons. She is typically described as an old spinster hen, thinner than the other hens in the chicken coop, wearing a blue bonnet and wire-rimmed glasses. She is often mocked by the other hens, who describe her as "old square britches".

History
Miss Prissy's first appearance was in the 1950 short An Egg Scramble, the only cartoon featuring her and Porky Pig together, in which the other hens are making fun of the fact that she cannot lay an egg, because she thinks it's embarrassing.

Her next appearances are centered on Foghorn Leghorn. In Lovelorn Leghorn (1951), she is set on finding a husband, and in Of Rice and Hen (1953), she is looking to have children. However, in Little Boy Boo (1954) she is depicted as a widow with a child, Egghead Jr., and with a much more extensive vocabulary in long sounding words other than her trademark "yeeesss." A Broken Leghorn (1959) and Strangled Eggs (1961) feature Henery Hawk, and in these shorts, it is usually Foghorn who is pursuing Prissy for his own selfish needs. He does, however, show an unusual sympathy for her emotional vulnerability.

Miss Prissy also appeared in the 1980 cartoon The Yolk's on You.

Later appearances
Miss Prissy (voiced by Tress MacNeille) appears in the film Tweety's High-Flying Adventure as part of the team of birds following Tweety's journey around the world. Miss Prissy (voiced by Grey DeLisle) appears in The Looney Tunes Show episode "The Foghorn Leghorn Story", where she played Mama Leghorn in Foghorn Leghorn's movie about him.

References

External links

Looney Tunes characters
Fictional chickens
Film characters introduced in 1950